Yankisyak (Yänkiśäk) is a rural locality (a village) in Mutabashevsky Selsoviet, Askinsky District, Bashkortostan, Russia. The population was 47 as of 2010. There is 1 street.

Geography 
Yankisyak is located 26 km northwest of Askino (the district's administrative centre) by road. Muta-Yelga is the nearest rural locality.

References 

Rural localities in Askinsky District